Saskatchewan Highway 19 is a highway in the Canadian province of Saskatchewan connecting Highway 15 northern extremity near Hawarden to Highway 18 at the southern extremity near Mankota.

Highway 19 was a case study for The Saskatchewan Centre for Excellence in Transportation and Infrastructure (SCETI). SCETI was working on further defining the SHELL curves for the low-lying Sub base sections. Due to the high clay content and the poor application of the culvert systems in the area, this case study will be able to address the issues currently ailing the road. The study concluded in the fall on 2012.

Between 2017-2021 numerous repairs have been made between Highway 15 to Elbow. This section sees the most road erosion due to seasonal weather changes. 
With better maintenance efforts in 2019-2020, safe travel has been greatly improved for motorists.

Route description 
Morse supplies all services located on Highway 1 near Highway 19, and is also near the Riverhurst Ferry. Sk route 19 provides access to Hawarden which is not located on Highway 19 directly. To travel to Tugaske from Saskatoon, the route involves travel along Highway 19.

Highway 19 provides access to several lakes, beaches, historical sites and buildings, and provincial parks. The Western Hemisphere Shorebird Interpretive Centre or The Chaplin Nature Centre is located on Chaplin Lake. In 1947, the Saskatchewan Minerals, the Sodium Sulfate plant opened at Chaplin. Sk Hwy 19 also provides close access to Morse Museum and Cultural Centre, which is located in the 1912 schoolhouse. Douglas Provincial Park is a nearby attraction that is accesses from Highway 19.

History 
A  paving project on Highway 19 north of Chaplin was announced June 8, 1999.
A  resurfacing project started July 7, 2000 at the junction of Highway 15 and continues south. This area is west of Kenaston and will assist tourism traffic to Lake Diefenbaker resorts. The  area south of the Highway 15 junction to Stronfield was used for a test section to develop a framework for highway management. This area has an increase in truck traffic from the potato industry, as well as increase in grain hauling to the Loreburn inland grain terminal. Average annual daily traffic AADT was 500 vehicles, of these 11% is due to commercial ventures. Besides economic interests, recreational sites are in the area.
Construction issues on Highway 19 involve a silty to heavy clay soil type in a rural area with a traffic load of full loaded trucks and semi trailers. About  of road experienced rutting and pavement failure prior to 2003. Experimental strengthening techniques were undertaken, which used a rotomix of the existing asphalt oil surface and mulched flax straw. This procedure underwent a series of tests examining whether an increase of the subgrade tensile strength occurred. Since 1999 Highway 19 has had a thin membrane surface (TMS) which has been subject to test studies of various cost-effective methods

cost-effective methods of road strengthening. Systems include granular soil strengthening and applications of different cement products, lime, various grades of fly ash, geotextiles, geogrids, natural and manufactured fibers, emulsified bitumen, tall oil, lignin, foamed bitumen, and synthetic ionic and cationic chemicals.

Major intersections
From south to north:

See also 
Roads in Saskatchewan
Transportation in Saskatchewan

References

External links 
Saskatchewan Highways and Transportation: Winter Highway Conditions

019